John Brydges may refer to:

 John Brydges, 1st Baron Chandos (1492–1557), English courtier, member of parliament and peer
 John Brydges, Marquess of Carnarvon (1703–1727), British member of parliament

See also
John Bridges (disambiguation)